The Milford Borough School District is a community public school district that serves students in pre-kindergarten through eighth grade from Milford, in Hunterdon County, New Jersey, United States.

As of the 2018–19 school year, the district, comprising one school, had an enrollment of 88 students and 11.4 classroom teachers (on an FTE basis), for a student–teacher ratio of 7.7:1. In the 2016–17 school year, Milford was the 5th-smallest enrollment of any school district in the state, with 81 students.

The district is classified by the New Jersey Department of Education as being in District Factor Group "FG", the fourth-highest of eight groupings. District Factor Groups organize districts statewide to allow comparison by common socioeconomic characteristics of the local districts. From lowest socioeconomic status to highest, the categories are A, B, CD, DE, FG, GH, I and J.

Students in public school for ninth through twelfth grades attend Delaware Valley Regional High School, together with students from Alexandria Township, Frenchtown, Holland Township and Kingwood Township. As of the 2018–19 school year, the high school had an enrollment of 721 students and 68.4 classroom teachers (on an FTE basis), for a student–teacher ratio of 10.5:1.

School
Milford Public School had an enrollment of 86 students in the 2018–19 school year.

Administration
Core members of the district's administration are:
Dr. Rick Falkenstein, Superintendent
Michele McCann, Business Administrator / Board Secretary

Board of education
The district's board of education, with five members, sets policy and oversees the fiscal and educational operation of the district through its administration. As a Type II school district, the board's trustees are elected directly by voters to serve three-year terms of office on a staggered basis, with either one or two seats up for election each year held (since 2012) as part of the November general election.

References

External links
Milford Public School

School Data for the Milford Borough School District, National Center for Education Statistics

Milford, New Jersey
New Jersey District Factor Group FG
School districts in Hunterdon County, New Jersey
Public K–8 schools in New Jersey